Yovanisik Caretsi was an Armenian monk and writer of the Safavid Empire. He worked at the monastery of St. Thaddeus in Tsar, where he oversaw the repair of manuscripts. He also wrote an untitled chronicle which primarily deals with the closing years of Shah Tahmasp I's reign (1524–1576), the turbulent reigns of Ismail II (1576–1577) and Mohammad Khodabanda (1578–1587), and the opening years of Shah Abbas the Great (1588–1629).

Biography 
Born in Tsar (also romanized as Car) near modern-day Kalbajar in 1560, Yovanisik became a monk at the local St. Thaddeus Monastery where he studied under Yovhannes, his paternal uncle. According to Peter Cowe, their similarity in names ("Yovanisik" being a diminutive of "Yovhannes") have led some scholars to confuse their identities. Yovanisik has also been confused with Nerses Gnunetsi, who held the same ecclesiastical rank. While at the monastic scriptorium, Yovanisik was involved in overseeing the repair of the older manuscripts, including a 14th-century work by Mattheos Jughayetsi. Yovanisik also wrote an untitled chronicle which he completed in 1600. Written in Armenian, the work primarily deals with the closing years of Shah Tahmasp I's reign, the turbulent reigns of Ismail II and Mohammad Khodabanda, and the opening years of Shah Abbas the Great. The work also includes some information about the life of Simon I of Kartli (Mahmud Khan) and the Long Turkish War (1593–1606). Yovanisik's name is inscribed on the south wall of a church in the village of Aghkilisa in Syunik. He died after 1621.

References

Sources 
 

1560 births
17th-century deaths
16th-century Armenian writers
17th-century Armenian writers
16th-century writers of Safavid Iran
17th-century writers of Safavid Iran
Armenian monks
People from Kalbajar District
Persian Armenians
Armenian male writers
16th-century historians